Thelma Björk Einarsdóttir (born 11 July 1990) is an Icelandic former footballer who played as a midfielder and defender. She capped 12 times for the Icelandic national team from 2010 to 2017. Thelma spent the majority of her career with Valur in the Icelandic top-tier Úrvalsdeild kvenna, winning the national championship six times and the Icelandic Cup three times.

She announced her retirement from football in February 2020. However, she returned to football in August 2021, appearing in 6 matches for KR in the second-tier 1. deild kvenna.

References

External links
 
 
 Cal Golden Bears Bio

1990 births
Living people
Thelma Bjork Einarsdottir
Thelma Bjork Einarsdottir
Thelma Bjork Einarsdottir
Thelma Bjork Einarsdottir
Thelma Bjork Einarsdottir
California Golden Bears women's soccer players
Women's association football defenders
Women's association football midfielders